Detroit is home to four professional U.S. sports teams; it is one of twelve cities in the United States to have teams from the four major North American sports. Since 2017, it is the only U.S. city to have its MLB, NFL, NBA, and NHL teams play within its downtown district (broadly defined) and one of only four U.S. cities to have said teams play within the city limits of their namesake.

All four teams compete within the city of Detroit.  There are three active major sports venues within the city: 41,782-seat Comerica Park (home of the Detroit Tigers), 65,000-seat Ford Field (home of the Detroit Lions), and Little Caesars Arena (home of the Detroit Red Wings and Detroit Pistons). Detroit is known for its avid hockey fans. Interest in the sport has given the city the moniker "Hockeytown."  In 2008, the Tigers  reported 3.2 million visitors with a 98.6 percent attendance rate.

In college sports, the University of Detroit Mercy has an National Collegiate Athletic Association (NCAA) Division I program. Wayne State University has a Division II program, and once had Division I teams in men's and women's ice hockey but has since dropped both sports. The NCAA football Quick Lane Bowl is held at Ford Field each December.

Major league sports

On July 12, 2005, Comerica Park hosted that year's Major League Baseball All-Star Game, and Ford Field hosted Super Bowl XL on February 5, 2006. Comerica Park hosted games 1 and 2 of the 2006 World Series, as well as games 3 and 4 of the 2012 World Series.

The Palace held NBA Finals games 3, 4 and 5 in both 2004 and 2005, and also hosted all but two home games of the Detroit Shock (now known as the Dallas Wings) in that franchise's four WNBA Finals appearances while based in the Detroit area (championships in 2003, 2006, and 2008, plus a losing appearance in 2007). The two exceptions were the title-clinching victories in 2006 and 2008, which both took place elsewhere due to scheduling conflicts—Joe Louis Arena in 2006 and the Eastern Michigan University Convocation Center in Ypsilanti in 2008.

In addition, the 2014 NHL Winter Classic was played on January 1, at Michigan Stadium in Ann Arbor. The Alumni Game and college and amateur hockey games were played on an ice surface at Comerica Park.

City of Champions (1930s)
Detroit was given the name "City of Champions" in the 1930s, for a series of successes both in individual and in team sport.  
The Detroit Lions won the National Football League championship in 1935. The Detroit Tigers won the American League pennant in 1934 and again in 1935, subsequently winning the World Series in 1935. The Detroit Red Wings won the National Hockey League's Stanley Cup in 1936 and 1937. This meant Detroit featured the defending champions in the NFL, NHL and MLB simultaneously from April 11, 1936 through October 5, 1936. Detroit remains the only city to win three major professional sports championships in the same year and until 2020 the only city to win NHL and NFL titles in the same year (a feat it repeated in 1952).

In individual sports, Gar Wood (a native Detroiter) won the Harmsworth Trophy for unlimited powerboat racing on the Detroit River in 1931.  In the following year, Eddie "the Midnight Express" Tolan, a black sprinter who had graduated from Detroit's Cass Technical High School in 1927, won the 100- and 200-meter races and two gold medals at the 1932 Summer Olympics. Boxer Joe Louis, who came to Detroit when he was 12 years old and started his professional career in the city, won the heavyweight championship of the world in 1937.

April 18, 2011 was the 75th anniversary of Champions Day in Michigan.

College sports

The following table shows the NCAA Division I and Division II college sports programs in the metro Detroit area:

There are also numerous small college athletic programs in the Detroit Metro area. 

On December 13, 2003, what was then the largest verified crowd in basketball history (78,129) packed Ford Field to watch the University of Kentucky defeat Michigan State University, 79–74. Ford Field hosted the Final Four of the 2009 NCAA Men's Division I Basketball Tournament.

The Frozen Four, the term for the semifinals and final of the NCAA Division I Men's Ice Hockey Tournament, was held at Ford Field on April 8 and 10, 2010.

Events

Detroit has bid to host Summer Olympic Games more often than any other city which has not yet hosted, participating in International Olympic Committee elections for the 1944 (placing 3rd, behind bid winner London), 1952 (5th place), 1956 (4th place), 1960 (3rd place), 1964 (2nd place), 1968 (2nd place) and 1972 (4th place) Games.

Oakland Hills Country Club, located in the Detroit suburb of Bloomfield Township, has hosted numerous high-profile golf events. It has hosted the U.S. Open six times, most recently in 1996; the PGA Championship three times, most recently in 2008; the U.S. Senior Open in 1981 and 1991; the U.S. Amateur in 2002; and the Ryder Cup in 2004. The 2034 and 2051 U.S. Open are scheduled for Oakland Hills Country Club.

The Detroit Marathon is also organized annually in the city, usually held in October.

Detroit is home to the Detroit Indy Grand Prix.  The race took place on the streets of downtown Detroit from 1982 until 1988, and then from 1989 (when the sanction moved from Formula One to IndyCars) at Belle Isle until now.  The race was not held from 2002−2006.

The Virginia Slims of Detroit was a WTA Tour women's tennis tournament held from 1972 to 1983, which featured top ranked players such as Margaret Court, Billie Jean King, Chris Evert and Martina Navratilova.

The UFC 9 mixed martial arts event was held at Cobo Arena in 1996 and UFC 123 at the Palace of Auburn Hills in 2010.

The Palace of Auburn Hills held NCAA Division I Wrestling Tournament Finals on March 15–17, 2007.

The Professional Bowlers Association Lumber Liquidators PBA Tour holds the Motor City Classic at Taylor Lanes in the suburb of Taylor.

The suburb of Southfield hosts the annual Gold Cup Polo tournament at Word of Faith International Christian Center, formerly known as Duns Scotus College.

The city hosted the Red Bull Air Race in 2008 on the International Riverfront.

Detroit's Cobo Arena hosted the NCAA Division I men's Indoor Track and Field Championships competition from 1965-1981. The Pontiac Silverdome hosted the event 1982-1983.

Water sports
Sailboat racing is a major sport in the Detroit area. Lake Saint Clair is home to many yacht clubs which host regattas. Bayview Yacht Club, the Detroit Yacht Club, Crescent Sail Yacht Club, Grosse Pointe Yacht Club, The Windsor Yacht Club, and the Edison Boat Club each participate in and are governed by the Detroit Regional Yacht-Racing Association or DRYA. Detroit is home to many One-Design fleets including North American 40s, Cal 25s, Cuthbertson and Cassian 35s, Crescent Sailboats, Express 27s, J 120s, J 105, and Flying Scots. The Crescent Sailboat, NA-40, and the L boat were designed and built exclusively in Detroit. Detroit also has a very active and competitive junior sailing program.

Since 1904, the city has been home to the American Power Boat Association Gold Cup unlimited hydroplane boat race, held annually on the Detroit River near Belle Isle.
Since 1916, the city has been home to Unlimited Hydroplane racing, held annually (with exceptions) on the Detroit River near Belle Isle. Often, the hydroplane boat race is for the APBA Challenge Cup, more commonly known as the Gold Cup (first awarded in 1904, created by Tiffany) which is the oldest active motorsport trophy in the world.

Teams

Racing

Other

Former teams

* In 1967, Detroit was selected as one of the cities to adopt a European professional soccer club in a bid to promote the game Stateside. The event was planned to coincide with Europe's off/close season when the teams would have otherwise been dormant for the summer. Detroit was represented by the Northern Irish team Glentoran, playing as the Detroit Cougars.

Venues

Media
Detroit has one FM radio station broadcasting sports in the metro Detroit area, 97.1 FM WXYT. WJR-AM 760 broadcasts the Michigan State Spartans games and WWJ-AM 950 broadcasts University of Michigan Wolverines games. There are now several sports podcast networks broadcasting daily. The Detroit Sports Podcast Network airs daily sports podcasts and has reporters covering sports all across metro Detroit.

Professional wrestling
Historically, Detroit was home to its own professional wrestling territory, Big Time Wrestling, from the 1950s until the 1980s. In 2007, Detroit hosted World Wrestling Entertainment (WWE)'s WrestleMania 23 which attracted 80,103 fans to Ford Field on April 1, 2007; the event marking the 20th anniversary of WrestleMania III which drew a reported 93,173 to the Pontiac Silverdome in nearby Pontiac in 1987. WWE has also held three of the annual Survivor Series events in Detroit with the 1991, 1999, and 2005 pay-per-views emanating from Joe Louis Arena, as well as Vengeance 2002. Detroit also hosted the returning Saturday Night's Main Event XXXII on March 18, 2006 and numerous episodes of the weekly Monday Night Raw and SmackDown telecasts since 1994 and 1999, respectively.

See also
 
Country Club of Detroit
Cycling in Detroit
Detroit Athletic Club
Detroit Boat Club
Detroit Yacht Club
Detroit Golf Club
Detroit Wolverines
1887 Detroit Wolverines season
Bally Sports Detroit
Grosse Pointe Yacht Club
Metro Detroit
Red Bull Air Race World Championship
U.S. cities with teams from four major sports
Multiple major sports championship seasons

Footnotes

References

Further reading

 Cameron, T.C. Metro Detroit's High School Basketball Rivalries. Arcadia Publishing, 2009. , 9780738560144. Available at Google Books.
 Cameron, T.C. Metro Detroit's High School Football Rivalries. Arcadia Publishing, 2008. , 9780738561684.

External links
Detroit Metro Sports Commission
West Michigan Sports Commission
In Play! magazine
Book - Detroit:City of Champions
Detroit Wolfetones Gaelic Football

 
Metro Detroit